Sprengelia minima is a species of flowering plant of the family Ericaceae, and is endemic to Tasmania. It is a small shrub usually growing in alpine cushion plants and has many branches, overlapping, stem-clasping, sharply-pointed leaves, and white, tube-shaped flowers arranged singly on the ends of branches.

Description
Sprengelia minima is a small shrub that usually grows in alpine cushion plants, sometimes with prostrate branchlets on their surface, and has many branches. The flowers are arranged singly, mainly on the ends of branches, with leaf-like bracts at the base. Flowering occurs from December to January and the fruit is a capsule.

Taxonomy
Sprengelia minima was first formally described in 2013 by R.K. Crowden in the journal Telopea. The specific epithet (minima) refers to the small size of the plant, compared to others in the genus.

Habitat and distribution
This sprengelia is moderately common in alpine areas of Tasmania, including on Mount Field and the Hartz Range, where it grows in cushion plants like Dracophyllum minimum and Domatia novae-zelandiae.

References

Epacridoideae
minima
Ericales of Australia
Flora of Tasmania
Plants described in 2013